The municipality of Sarandí del Yí is one of the municipalities of Durazno Department, Uruguay. Its seat is the city of Sarandí del Yí.

Location 
The municipality is located in the southwest area of the Durazno Department.

History 
The municipality of Guichón was created by Law N° 18.653 of 15 March 2010, in compliance with what was provided by Law N° 18567 of decentralization and citizen participation. This law mandated the creation of municipalities in every settlement with a population above 2000 inhabitants. The constituencies RDC, RDD and RDE of Durazno Department were assigned to this municipality.

Settlements 
The only populated place of this municipality is the city of Sarandí del Yí.

Authorities 
The authority of the municipality is the Municipal Council, integrated by the Mayor (who presides it) and four Councilors.

References 

Sarandí del Yí